

Composition of the troupe of the Comédie-Française in 1755 
The theatrical year began 17 April 1755 (the day before Palm) and ended 10 April 1755.

Sources 
 Almanach historique et chronologique de tous les spectacles, Paris 1756.

1755
1755 in France